Ferskeytt (literally 'four-cornered') is an Icelandic stanzaic poetic form. It is a kind of quatrain, and probably first attested in fourteenth-century rímur such as Ólafs ríma Haraldssonar. It remains one of the dominant metrical forms in Icelandic versifying to this day.

Ferskeytt comprises odd-numbered, basically trochaic lines with four stresses in the pattern / x / x / x /, alternating with even-numbered trochaic lines with three stresses in the pattern / x / x / x. In each line, one unstressed syllable may be replaced with two unstressed syllables. Stanzas are normally of four lines, and rhyme aBaB. In the first line, two heavily-stressed syllables alliterate with the first heavily-stressed syllable of the second line, and so on in the usual alliterative pattern of Germanic alliterative verse.

An example of the form is this verse by Jónas Hallgrímsson, with a translation into the same metre by Dick Ringler. Alliteration is emboldened and rhyme is italicised:

There are many variations on ferskeytt, whose common principle is that they are quatrains with some kind of alternate rhyme. A poem in this metre is called a ferskeytla ('four-cornered [poem]'). Metres which share these properties belong to the ferskeytluætt ('ferskeytla-family').

References

External links

 Hólmfríður Pétursdóttir singing in ferskeytt: 'Þegar vetrar þokan grá'
 Ingibjörg Friðriksdóttir singing in ferskeytt: 'Ferskeytlan er lítið ljóð'
 Gunnar Helgmundur Alexandersson singing in ferskeytt: 'Ferskeytlan er Frónbúans'

Poetic devices
Medieval poetry
Old Norse poetry
Icelandic literature
Icelandic music
Rímur